Frontiers of Physics (formerly Frontiers of Physics in China from 2006 to 2010) is a bimonthly peer-reviewed academic journal established in 2006 and co-published by Higher Education Press (China) and Springer Verlag (Germany). Topics covered include quantum mechanics and quantum information; gravitation, cosmology and astrophysics; elementary particles and fields; nuclear physics; atomic physics, molecular physics, optical physics; statistical physics and nonlinear physics; plasma physics and accelerator physics; condensed matter physics; nanostructures and functional materials; and soft matter, biological physics and interdisciplinary physics.

Physics journals
Springer Science+Business Media academic journals
Publications established in 2006
English-language journals
Bimonthly journals